Abyshevo is a rural locality (a selo) in Padunskoye Rural Settlement of Promyshlennovsky District, Kemerovo Oblast, Russia. The population was 731 as of 2010. There are 8 streets.

Geography 
Abyshevo is located 48 km northwest of Promyshlennaya (the district's administrative centre) by road. Padunskaya is the nearest rural locality.

References 

Rural localities in Kemerovo Oblast